KEYreit (formerly Scott's Real Estate Investment Trust) was a publicly traded real estate investment trust in Canada that owns over 200 retail properties comprising more than  in 9 provinces across the country.

The REIT primarily focuses on the acquisition of small box retail (banks, financial institutions, pharmacies, restaurants and other retail establishments)  properties in attractive Canadian markets.

It was bought by PlazaCorp in June 2013.

References

External links
 
 www.plaza.ca

Companies formerly listed on the Toronto Stock Exchange
Real estate companies of Canada
Real estate investment trusts of Canada